Željko Mijač (13 January 1954 – 14 February 2022) was a Croatian football manager and player.

Playing career
During his playing career he has played with HNK Hajduk Split (1974–76; 43/10) and NK Rijeka (1976–81; 72/7) in the Yugoslav First League. He made his debut for Hajduk in August 1973 in a Yugoslav Cup match and played 146 games for them in total, 83 of them in official matches. For Rijeka, Mijač played 117 official games (102 of them in the league), scoring 15 goals.

Later, he continued his career in France. He ended his career playing in Italy in 1987.

Managerial career
Mijač was the coach of Standard de Liège during 1999. He then worked as assistant coach of Bahrain national team, Hajduk Split, Persepolis and Rah Ahan. During his tenure at Rah Ahan, he managed a single match during 2011–12 Iran Pro League when the team's coach, Ali Daei was one of the guests of 2011 FIFA Ballon d'Or at Zürich and couldn't coach the team in the next day's match. The match ended as a 1–0 loss to Malavan. In January 2020, he was appointed manager of Croatian third tier-club Urania Baška Voda, only to be sacked and replaced by former Australia goalkeeper Zeljko Kalac in October 2021.

Personal life

Death
He died after a short illness on 14 February 2022, at the age of 68.

Honours
Hajduk Split
Yugoslav First League: 1973–74, 1974–75
Yugoslav Cup: 1976

Rijeka
Yugoslav Cup: 1978, 1979
Balkans Cup: 1979

References

External links
 
 Zerodic.com (Stats from Yugoslav Leagues)
 Vijest je stigla nenadano, kao i sve zle vijesti što stižu: smrt ne bira, zapravo... bira najbolje. Adio, Cico naš i neka ti je laka zemlja... (Profile) - Sloboda Dalmacija 

1954 births
2022 deaths
Footballers from Split, Croatia
Association football midfielders
Yugoslav footballers
HNK Rijeka players
HNK Hajduk Split players
SC Toulon players
AC Arlésien players
FC Istres players
A.S.D. Castel di Sangro Calcio players
Yugoslav First League players
Yugoslav expatriate footballers
Expatriate footballers in France
Yugoslav expatriate sportspeople in France
Expatriate footballers in Italy
Yugoslav expatriate sportspeople in Italy
Croatian football managers
Standard Liège managers
Expatriate football managers in Belgium
Croatian expatriate sportspeople in Belgium
Standard Liège non-playing staff
Persepolis F.C. non-playing staff
Croatian expatriate sportspeople in Bahrain
Croatian expatriate sportspeople in Iran
Burials at Lovrinac Cemetery